Cleveland Central railway station was a railway station on Queensland Rail suburban network in Brisbane, the state capital of Queensland, Australia. It was located between Raby Bay and Cleveland stations on the Cleveland railway line.

History
The station opened in 1890 with the opening of the railway beyond Manly. It was originally named Cleveland. When the line was extended towards Cleveland point in 1897, the new terminus was named Cleveland and the former terminus was named West Cleveland. It was renamed Cleveland Central in 1914.

Almost all the farm produce from the Redlands was loaded onto rollingstock at Cleveland Central station. On the days which other produce were loaded, such as tomatoes, three separate trains were required. The farmers brought their produce to the loading site in fruit wagons drawn by two horses and spring carts with one horse. More successful farmers transported produce using a Model T Ford one tone truck.

The station closed in 1960 with the closure of the railway beyond Lota. The site of the station is now part of Linear Park on the eastern side of Ross Creek.

Following the closure of the station, the station master's house was moved to Middle Street in front of the Cleveland RSL. On 12 July 2017, the building was moved to a new location on Shore Street North to make way for a redevelopment of the Cleveland RSL.

References

Disused railway stations in Queensland
Railway stations closed in 1960
Railway stations in Australia opened in 1890
Railway stations in Redland City